Philippe Collet (born 13 December 1963 in Nancy) is a retired French pole vaulter. He twice competed at the Olympic Games, in 1988 and 1992, reaching the final on both occasions. In addition, he represented Europe at the World Cup three times finishing second in 1985 and 1992 and first in 1989.

His personal bests in the event are 5.85 metres outdoors (Paris 1986) and 5.94 metres indoors (Grenoble 1990).

He now coaches his two sons, Thibaut and Mathieu.

International competitions

1Representing Europe

See also
 French all-time top lists - Pole vault

External links

1963 births
Living people
French male pole vaulters
Athletes (track and field) at the 1988 Summer Olympics
Athletes (track and field) at the 1992 Summer Olympics
Olympic athletes of France
Sportspeople from Nancy, France
European Athletics Championships medalists
Universiade medalists in athletics (track and field)
Universiade silver medalists for France
Medalists at the 1985 Summer Universiade